Larmandier-Bernier is a Grower Champagne producer.

History
Champagne Larmandier-Bernier was established upon the marriage of Philippe Larmandier and Elisabeth Bernier in 1971; their families have been active in the Champagne region since the French Revolution.

Vineyards
Larmandier-Bernier has fifteen hectares under vine,  including the Côte des Blancs Grand Cru villages  Cramant, Chouilly, Oger and Avize, and the premier cru village of Vertus. Most of the family's vineyards are planted to Chardonnay, and about 15% are planted to Pinot Noir. The average age of the vines is 33 years.

Vinification
The Larmandier-Bernier winemaking process never adds more than five grams per liter of sugar. The family estate   began to produce organic wine in 1992, and transitioned to biodynamic viticulture in 1999.  Larmandier-Bernier uses only indigenous yeasts.

Awards and honors
Larmandier-Bernier  has been rated as one of Champagne's top five producers by Andrew Jefford in   The New France.

References

External links

Champagne (wine)